Halichoeres nigrescens, or the bubblefin wrasse, is a species of salt water wrasse found in the Indo-West Pacific Ocean.

Size

References

nigrescens
Taxa named by Marcus Elieser Bloch
Taxa named by Johann Gottlob Theaenus Schneider
Fish described in 1801